The 1972 Washington gubernatorial election was held on November 7, 1972. Incumbent Governor of Washington Daniel J. Evans, who was first elected eight years earlier, and then re-elected in 1968, was eligible for re-election, as Washington does not have gubernatorial term limits. 

A total of nine candidates filed for the primary on September 19. In the general election, incumbent Republican Governor Evans was challenged by former Governor Albert Rosellini, who ran as a Democrat, and by businessman Vick Gould, who ran with the Taxpayers' Party, a third party of Gould's own creation. Evans and Rosellini received 24.66% and 30.27% of the votes in the primary, respectively. On election day, Evans defeated Rosellini by a comfortable margin of 50.78%-42.82% in a rematch of the 1964 contest.

Primary

Candidates

Republican Party
Daniel J. Evans, incumbent Governor
L. R. Kemore, candidate for Governor in 1948
Earl Monaghan
John "Hugo Frye" Patric, perennial candidate
Perry Woodall, State Senator

Democratic Party
Martin Durkan Sr., State Senator
Jim McDermott, psychiatrist and State Representative
Albert Rosellini, former Governor
Rudolfo Valdez

Results

General election

Candidates
Albert Rosellini (D), former Governor
Daniel J. Evans (R), incumbent Governor

Results

See also
Arthur B. Langlie – A former Governor of Washington who made a successful comeback in 1940

References

1972
1972 United States gubernatorial elections
Gubernatorial